Garth Stroup House, also known as the Merrifield-Cass House, is a historic home located at Mishawaka, St. Joseph County, Indiana.  The original one-story dwelling was built in 1837, and enlarged to two-stories and one-story wing added in 1867.  The frame dwelling exhibits Greek Revival, Federal, and Carpenter Gothic style design elements.  It sits on a fieldstone and brick foundation.  It features porches with gingerbread trim.  The house is thought to be the oldest dwelling in continuing use in Mishawaka.

It was listed on the National Register of Historic Places in 1983.

References

Houses on the National Register of Historic Places in Indiana
Federal architecture in Indiana
Greek Revival houses in Indiana
Houses completed in 1837
Houses in St. Joseph County, Indiana
National Register of Historic Places in St. Joseph County, Indiana